Granite Flats is an American television series, the first original scripted drama series produced by BYUtv. The show is set in a small Colorado town in the early 1960s during the Cold War, and follows several of the town's citizens as mysterious and potentially dangerous circumstances arise. Season 1 launched on April 7, 2013.  The cast was joined by actors Christopher Lloyd and Cary Elwes for its second season, which premiered April 6, 2014. Parker Posey and George Newbern joined the cast for season 3, premiered online April 4, 2015, before the TV season launch scheduled for October. It had an audience of approximately 500,000 households per episode.

On April 20, 2015 it was announced that Granite Flats would join Netflix; all three seasons launched on the streaming service on May 15, 2015.

On June 25, 2015, Granite Flats executive producer Scott Swofford announced the end of the series after three seasons, calling it a "huge success."

Production
The show was produced in Salt Lake City, Utah, in a former high school converted into eight dedicated sets recreating early 1960s America. Because BYUtv is intended for a family audience that shares Church of Jesus Christ of Latter-day Saints values, there is no smoking, no adult or extramarital content, and all alcohol consumption is portrayed in a distinctly negative light.

Development
During 2010 and 2011, newly appointed BYUtv director of content, Scott Swofford, commissioned focus groups targeting TV viewers who were at least nominally religious, to see what they liked, disliked and wanted in TV. Swofford summarized the results as, "We want to be entertained. Then we'll stick around for the message." This led to the creation of the pilot for Granite Flats, which became BYUtv's first and flagship original scripted television drama series, and went on to significantly expand the channel's audience, eventually attracting about 500,000 viewers per episode, compared to the previous top-rated show, Love of Quilting, which typically drew under 10,000.

Financing and budget
According to Swofford, the show is funded and non-profit: "We're not ad-driven, so we're not looking at the Nielsens the next day and saying, 'Oh gosh, did we do okay?' We're saying 'Did it work? Is it happening? Is it reaching the audience we want?' ... It's a whole different metric, and it is weird to have the opportunity to play in this arena without having to obey some of those rules. It makes it possible to do independent work." Each show cost $800,000, about a third of the industry standard in Hollywood.

Series end
On June 25, 2015, Granite Flats Executive Producer and BYUtv Director of Content, Scott Swofford, announced the end of the series after three seasons, calling it a "huge success." According to Swofford, "We look forward to what is on the horizon in the form of additional scripted content at BYUtv and have chosen to concentrate resources on these ideas and forego producing a fourth season of Granite Flats."

Cast

Stars 
 Jonathan Morgan Heit plays Arthur Milligan, the new kid in town, who quickly forms a friendship with Timmy Sanders and Madeline Andrews.
 Annie Tedesco (seasons 1 & 2) played Beth Milligan, a young mother who moves to Granite Flats with her son Arthur after the death of her husband. In season 2 she becomes the nurse over the special ward and becomes part of Project Madman. In between seasons 2 and 3 her character is killed in a suspicious car accident.
 Richard Gunn plays the chief of police John Sanders, a man who's serious about his job and doesn't give up easily to bring justice to Granite Flats.
 Charlie Plummer plays Timmy Sanders, the police chief's son who gets excited about solving mysteries.
 Malia Tyler plays Madeline Andrews, an intelligent girl of Korean descent, friend of Timmy and Arthur.
 Peter Murnik plays Hershel Jenkins, an army sergeant who gets accused of setting off a bomb inside the army base. After John Sanders proves his innocence, Jenkins is let go by the army. He is eventually made a deputy in Granite Flats.
 Ethan Ross Wills plays Wallace Jenkins. Wallace is originally the school bully, but a number of insecurities are shown inside him when his father gets arrested. He gets taken in by Regina and lives with her for a time. In season 3 Wallace moves back in with his father, develops his first crush, and joins Timmy, Madeline, and Arthur to solve mysteries. 
 David Naughton plays Dr. Millard Whittison, the head of Granite Flats hospital and the CIA contact for Project Madman, part of Project MK Ultra.
 Tom Wright (supporting seasons 1 & 2, star season 3) plays FBI agent Ezekiel Scott. Originally he comes to Granite Flats searching for the Soviet satellite that crashed, but he is forced to return and lead FBI operatives in the search for possible Soviet spies. He works unofficially with John in the manhunt.

Supporting
 Scott Christopher plays Lt. Frank Quincy, an officer whose prolonged stay at the army hospital piques Beth's curiosity.
 Jessica Wright plays Regina Clark. Regina is a nurse at the hospital and is co-workers to Beth Milligan and Dr. Millard Whittison. She also acts as the surrogate mother for Wallace Jenkins. She has a strong faith and believes anyone can change but requires seeing some proof before making up her mind. 
 Ivan Sergei plays Roy Milligan, father of Arthur and husband of Beth. His wife and son believe him to be dead, but he is actually undercover in Russia, possibly turned to the Russian side of the Cold War.
 Jim Turner plays Dr. Ronald Andrews, the father of Madeline Andrews and the lead doctor on Project Madman.
 Maia Guest plays Dr. Susan Andrews, the mother of Madeline Andrews and one of the doctors working on Project Madman.
 Taryn O'Neill plays June Sanders, wife to John and mother to Timmy. 
 Mitchell Fink plays Pastor Todd, the pastor at Granite Flats Church of Christ and the leader of the weekday youth group.
 Brandon Molale played Major Slim Kirkpatrick. Slim was Regina's love interest and also the head of the military police. He was secretly a Soviet spy. He tried to get Hershel executed for blowing up the welding shop, which was blown up because of a gas leak caused by a piece of Soviet satellite debris. The FBI and John eventually begin to suspect Slim of being a spy, so Slim tried to get Whittison to hand him the info on Project Madman. When Whittison refused Slim tried to shoot it out with Police Chief John Sanders and lost.

Guest stars
 Christopher Lloyd plays Professor Stanfield Hargraves, a smart and teasing English teacher with a specialty in Shakespeare. 
 Cary Elwes plays Hugh Ashmead, a CIA counter-intelligence officer who threatens to take over Project Madman for his own purposes. In real life, the name "Ashmead" was the cover name for James Angleton who headed the CIA's counterintelligence program during the era the show is set.
 George Newbern plays Scottie Andrews, a civil-liberties attorney from New York City who is an uncle to Madeline Andrews.
 Parker Posey plays Alice White, the aunt of Arthur Milligan who has just been released from prison after spending a decade there for murder. She has visions that sometimes come true.

Episodes

Season One (2013)

Season Two (2014)

Season Three (2015)
 BYUtv announced on July 16, 2014, that Granite Flats will return for its third season in April 2015.
 Season Three began filming on Monday, September 22, 2014.
 Granite Flats, Season Three, was launched with all 8 episodes available online at graniteflats.com and byutv.org Saturday, April 4, 2015.
 All three seasons debuted on Netflix on May 15, 2015.
 The season 3 episodes will appear on BYUtv in October 2015.

See also 
 Project MKUltra Real-life, illegal CIA program conducted on unsuspecting American citizens, including hallucinogenic drug experiments on them without their consent

References

General
"BYUtv-Netflix deal for ‘Granite Flats’ looks like pure genius" - Salt Lake Tribune
"How a Mormon-made Cold War drama got the attention of Netflix" - Business Insider

External links
 
 

Period family drama television series
BYU TV original programming
Television series set in the 1960s
Television shows set in Colorado